Timothy Nicholas Dadabo (born March 1961) is an American voice actor and singer. He is known for his voice over work in video games, movies and TV shows.

Filmography

TV series

Films
A Turtle's Tale: Sammy's Adventures – Policeman
Escape from Planet Earth – Larry Longeyes
Two Dreadful Children – Dick Dunbar

Documentaries
Outrageous Acts of Psych – Narrator
Outrageous Acts of Science – Himself – Narrator, narrator
The Year in Pup Culture – Himself

Video games

References

External links
Official site
IMDb entry

1961 births
Living people
Place of birth missing (living people)
American male television actors
American male voice actors
American male singers